The New York Psychoanalytic Society and Institute — founded in 1911 by Dr. Abraham A. Brill — is the oldest psychoanalytic organization in the United States.

The charter members were: Louis Edward Bisch, Brill, Horace Westlake Frink, Frederick James Farnell, William C. Garvin, August Hoch, Morris J. Karpas, George H. Kirby, Clarence P. Oberndorf, Bronislaw Onuf, Ernest Marsh Poate, Charles Ricksher, Jacob Rosenbloom, Edward W. Scripture and Samuel A. Tannenbaum.

The institute was a professional home to some of the leaders in psychoanalytic education and treatment, such as Margaret Mahler, Ernst Kris, Kurt R. Eissler, Heinz Hartmann, Abram Kardiner, Rudolph Loewenstein, Charles Brenner, Thaddeus Ames, Robert C. Bak, and Otto Kernberg.

References

External links 
 Official web site

Freudian psychology
Psychology organizations based in the United States
Organizations established in 1911
1911 establishments in New York City
Psychoanalysis in the United States
Mental health organizations in New York (state)